Kappa Sigma Kappa is the name of three separate college fraternities, sharing a common history and traditions but disconnected by decades and a break in organizational continuity. 

A larger, second incarnation sparked by the memory of the first group at the University of Virginia was formed approximately fifty years after the first merger, leading to the creation of over seventy new chapters. Some of Kappa Sigma Kappa's chapters were unable to join in this merger due to NIC rules, leading to a third incarnation of the fraternity, but a decade later, in the late 's, the national organization dissipated as a formal entity. One chapter remained active until .

First incarnation (1867–1886)

History
 John M. Tutwiler
 James Gunnell Hurst
 Kenneth McDonald
 David Gamble Murrell

On that night, Cadet Tutwiler invited the three other cadets to his room where the fraternity was founded. The original name selected for the fraternity was C.E.C., but it was soon changed to Kappa Sigma Kappa. The letters "C.E.C." would continue to retain ritual significance in the new fraternity.

One chapter merged into Sigma Nu.

Symbols and traditions
The badge was a gold Jerusalem cross in the center of which is a circular black enameled disc displaying the letters of the fraternity. The letters "C.E.C." are engraved on the back of every badge.

Chapter list
Those listed in bold continued with another organization, those listed in italics were dormant when the fraternity disbanded.

Second incarnation (1935–1962)

History
Almost fifty years after the original fraternity had dissolved, a group of four students at the University of Virginia desired to form a new social fraternity in 1935. They were attracted to the Kappa Sigma Kappa badge, so they decided to revive the former fraternity as their own. After searching the University of Virginia archives, the students found the names of three members from the old Delta chapter who were still alive, including two charter members. They then discovered that one of the founders of the original fraternity, Kenneth McDonald, was still alive and living in San Francisco, California. The students made contact with McDonald, and he assisted them in redeveloping the fraternity and learning many of the original fraternity traditions. Seven chapters of the new Kappa Sigma Kappa were established before World War II.

After the war, the fraternity placed an emphasis on expansion. New chapters were rapidly established, and members of the fraternity felt the need to become better organized on a national level. The fraternity held its first national convention in St. Louis, Missouri in 1948. National conventions continued to be held every year, but the fraternity still lacked a strong national organization. Although the fraternity had experienced great growth in the years after the war, Kappa Sigma Kappa found itself struggling by the early 1950s. It had allowed several chapters on campuses of unaccredited schools, and as a result Kappa Sigma Kappa was unable to obtain membership in the National Interfraternity Conference (NIC). As a result of its lack of NIC membership, lack of uniform chapter operations, and lack of a strong national organization and central office, Kappa Sigma Kappa began rapidly losing its chapters in the 1950s as they began to affiliate with other NIC fraternities.

Kappa Sigma Kappa saw a merger with Theta Xi as its opportunity to repair its rapidly deteriorating situation. As a result of the merger, twenty-one chapters of Kappa Sigma Kappa located at accredited schools became chapters of Theta Xi. In addition, one further chapter of Kappa Sigma Kappa at Lawrence Technological University joined when the school was accredited. Each of the chapters was given a new Greek-letter chapter designation that was prefaced by the letter Kappa.

Merger symbolism
As part of the terms of the merger, the fraternity flower of Theta Xi was changed from the white carnation to the blue iris. The Theta Xi coat of arms was modified to replace its fleurs-de-lis with upright crescents, and the fraternity pledge manual title was changed from The Theta Xi Pledge Manual to The Quest For Theta Xi.

Chapter list
Chapters that were active at the time of the  Theta Xi merger, or which had withdrawn from the national fraternity as new local chapters or to join another national fraternity, are noted in bold. Dormant chapters at that time are noted in italics. 

This was the "third iteration" of the fraternity. These are listed separately, below.

Third incarnation (1962–1992)
Seven active chapters of the former Kappa Sigma Kappa fraternity were not accepted by Theta Xi in the 1962 merger because they were located at unaccredited schools. Although their national organization had merged and was now a part of Theta Xi, these seven chapters formed a new national structure and continued to use the Kappa Sigma Kappa name. In turn, they began approving new chapters of Kappa Sigma Kappa on more campuses, often at community colleges. During the late 1970s, the national organization dissolved but the Pennsylvania Alpha chapter remained active until 1992.

Chapter list
Chapters held over into the third iteration of the Kappa Sigma Kappa or created after the merger, include the following. Those that merged or withdrew into another national organization are noted in bold, those that were dormant at the late-'s dissolution of the national fraternity are noted in italics.

{| class="wikitable sortable"
! Chapter
! Date
! College or University
! Location
! Status
! Notes
|-
| Maryland Alpha
| – ?
| University of Baltimore
| Baltimore, Maryland
| Dormant
|   
|-
| Illinois Epsilon
| –
| Chicago Technical College 
| Chicago, Illinois
| Dormant
| 
|-
| New York Gamma
| –
| Erie County Technical Institute
| Buffalo, New York
| Dormant
| 
|-
| Illinois Zeta ?
| –19xx ?, –19xx ?
| Quincy College
| Quincy, Illinois
| Dormant ?
| 
|-
| Indiana Gamma
| –
| Tri-State University (now Trine University)
| Angola, Indiana
| Withdrew
| 
|-
| New York Eta
| –
| Westchester Community College
| Valhalla, New York
| Dormant
| 
|-
| New York Theta
| –19xx ?
| Hudson Valley Community College
| Troy, New York
| Dormant
| 
|-
| New Jersey Alpha
| –197x ?
| Mercer County Community College
| Trenton, New Jersey
| Dormant
| 
|-
| Pennsylvania Alpha| –
| Spring Garden College
| Philadelphia, Pennsylvania
| Dormant
| 
|-
| Missouri Alpha| –197x ?
| Finley College of Engineering
| Kansas City, Missouri
| Dormant
| 
|-
| Texas Alpha| –197x ?
| University of Corpus Christi
| Corpus Christi, Texas
| Dormant
| 
|-
| Maryland Beta| 196x–
| Baltimore College of Commerce
| Baltimore, Maryland
| Merged (MD Alpha chapter)
| 
|-
| New York Kappa Colony| 1994–197x ?
| State University of New York, Brockport
| Brockport, New York
| Dormant
| 
|}

There may have been up to 30 chapters in this third iteration of the fraternity. That same reference notes there being 30 chapters of the fraternity at that time. Thus some chapters may be missing from this third chapter list.

Notes

See also
 Phi Delta Theta
 Theta Xi

References

Virginia Military Institute
University of Virginia
Student organizations established in 1867
Student organizations established in 1935
Student societies in the United States
Defunct fraternities and sororities
1867 establishments in Virginia